Jornal da República is the government gazette of East Timor.

The Journal is published by the Ministry of Justice.  It was first published on 20 May 2002, the day East Timor resumed its independence. The first issue promulgated the President's Decree appointing Mari Hamud Alkatiri as Prime Minister of East Timor.

By law, the contents of the Journal, once published in paper format, must be sent in electronic format to the Department of Technology and Information of the Ministry of Justice, which is responsible for publication of the Journal on its official website.

See also
List of government gazettes

References

External links
  

East Timor
Government of East Timor
Publications established in 2002
2002 establishments in East Timor